SiliCon with Adam Savage (formally Silicon Valley Comic Con) is an annual pop culture and technology convention, at the San Jose Convention Center in San Jose, California. The convention was founded by Steve Wozniak, Stan Lee and Rick White. The inaugural event was held March 18–20, 2016 at San Jose's McEnery Convention Center. The convention was rebranded as SiliCon in early 2020 and Adam Savage was appointed as the creative director.

History 

Silicon Valley Comic Con was first announced April 17, 2015 through an online video featuring Steve Wozniak and Stan Lee. The aim was to bring together popular culture touchstones such as comics, movies, genre TV and technology together as one convention. Including panels featuring creative artists, writers, actors, directors, producers, and science communicators.

Silicon Valley Comic Con will be the San Francisco Bay Area's first large multi-genre convention since the departure of WonderCon after that convention's 2011 show. Since WonderCon's departure the largest convention left in the Bay Area had been Big Wow! Comicfest, which is being added to Silicon Valley Comic Con's schedule.

On July 13, 2016 the second annual event was confirmed to be occurring April 21–23, 2017 at the San Jose Convention Center as well as expanding into several additional venues nearby.

On February 20, 2020 the convention was renamed SiliCon, and Adam Savage was named the new creative director. The 2020 event was to have taken place October 16–18 at the San Jose Convention Center, but the COVID-19 pandemic forced officials to move to a virtual show.

Features and events 

The convention aims to include both popular culture and technology in what Wozniak hopes will be a uniquely Silicon Valley flavor. In that spirit the convention will have typical comic convention staples such as an "artists alley", but will also have an "app alley" featuring new and emerging technology items. Several movie and television studios will be represented at the inaugural event including Warner Bros. Pictures, Lionsgate and AMC. Additionally several technology-focused guests will be involved as well including astrophysicists and technologists.

SiliCon 2020 will virtually expand upon its entertainment, science, comics and tech programming and create new events such as maker workshops, futurecasting sessions, cosplay tips and tricks, innovative new tech hubs, increased Q&A time with celebrities and more. SiliCon will host new vendors showcasing new materials for the cosplay and maker communities. There will be something for the professional as well as the beginning maker, plus more activities fit for the entire family.

Convention Locations

See also

2016 in comics

References

External links

Comics conventions in the United States
Annual events in Silicon Valley
Conventions in California
Events in San Jose, California
Culture of San Jose, California
Multigenre conventions
Culture in the San Francisco Bay Area
Events in the San Francisco Bay Area
Tourist attractions in the San Francisco Bay Area